Cerro Napa is a Pliocene stratovolcano north of the Salar de Coposa, straddling the border between Bolivia and Chile. 

Part of its slopes are covered with pyroclastics; radiometric dating has yielded ages of 11.9 ± 0.6, 9.99 ± 0.1 and 1.38 million years ago. This low elevation probably relates to the easterly position of the volcano and likely correlates to lake highstands in Salar de Coposa, Salar de Empexa and Salar de Huasco.

References 

Pleistocene stratovolcanoes
Miocene stratovolcanoes
Stratovolcanoes of Chile
Stratovolcanoes of Bolivia